There are two Merton Professorships of English in the University of Oxford: the Merton Professor of English Language and Literature, and the Merton Professor of English Literature.  The second was created in 1914 when Sir Walter Raleigh's chair was renamed.  At the present day both professorships are associated with Merton College, but Dame Helen Gardner held her post in association with Lady Margaret Hall.  The occupants of the chairs have been:

Merton Professor of English Language and Literature

1885 – 1916: Arthur S. Napier
1916 – 1920: vacant
1920 – 1945: H. C. K. Wyld
1945 – 1959: J. R. R. Tolkien
1959 – 1980: Norman Davis
1980 – 1984: vacant
1984 – 2014: Suzanne Romaine
2018 onwards: Helen Small

Merton Professor of English Literature

1904 – 1922: Walter A. Raleigh
1922 – 1928: George Stuart Gordon
1929 – 1946: David Nichol Smith
1947 – 1957: F.P. Wilson
1957 – 1966: Nevill Coghill
1966 – 1975: Helen Gardner
1975 – 2002: John Carey
2002 - 2014: David Norbrook
2016–present: Lorna Hutson

References

Sources 
Oxford Dictionary of National Biography.
The Times.

Professorships at the University of Oxford
Lists of people associated with the University of Oxford
Merton College, Oxford